In 1929, elections were held to the Congress of Soviets of the Soviet Union.

The elections were noteworthy for their rowdiness and elements of political opposition. Within the Communist Party, the Left Opposition attempted to run rival candidates against the officially nominated Communist candidates, while outside the party the Russian Orthodox Church attempted to create an organized opposition with religious candidates. Kulaks, Tolstoyans, and Baptists also were active in illicit anti-Communist electoral campaigning. Peasants demanded the creation of "peasant unions" on an equal footing with urban trade unions, and urban workers complained that Communist officials had become a new privileged class. Ethnic strife and the Soviet government's financial support of Comintern were also issues raised against the official candidates. Marches in opposition to the official candidates were held and in some areas in the provinces Communist officials were physically attacked.

However, in the actual elections the communist candidates won a large majority and the opposition forces did not make any headway.

References
Fitzpatrick, Sheila. 1999. Everyday Stalinism: Ordinary Life in Extraordinary Times: Soviet Russia in the 1930s. New York: Oxford University Press, pp. 180–182.

Legislative elections in the Soviet Union
1929 elections in the Soviet Union
Soviet Union
Soviet Union